Mount Analogue is an album by John Zorn released in January 2012 on the Tzadik label.

Reception

Allmusic said  "From Jewish and other Middle Eastern folk musics to soundtrack atmospherics, exotica-tinged jazz, Latin rhythms, and contemporary classical inquiries into minimalism, tone, space, color, and counterpoint, all are on display in this wonderfully musical, meditative, hypnotic, and "mystical" work. The accessibility factor in Mount Analogue is high; what begins as a musical question eventually resolves, usually through a circular method that is deeply satisfying". Martin Schray commented "The musicians easily move between angular new classical music, restrained mumbling and panting, 1950s film noir soundtracks, Jewish or Middle Eastern folk, the typical John Zorn exotica, jazz, lonely piano tunes, or minimalist approaches. Every note is exactly at the right place, there is not one bell tone too much, which creates a lush atmosphere on the one hand but the spooky and creepy elements refer to a dark world also inherent in this music".

Track listing

Personnel
Brian Marsella - piano, organ, vocals
Kenny Wollesen - vibraphone, chimes, vocals 
Shanir Ezra Blumenkranz - bass, oud, gimbri, vocals
Tim Keiper - calabash, drums, percussion, orchestral bells, vocals
Cyro Baptista - percussion, prayer bells, vocals

References

John Zorn albums
Albums produced by John Zorn
Tzadik Records albums
2012 albums